The Dallas Open is a men's ATP indoor hard court tennis tournament held in Dallas, Texas. The event takes place at the Styslinger/Altec Tennis Complex. The tournament was relocated here from Uniondale, New York where it was known as the New York Open. The 2022 Dallas Open marked a return for the ATP Tour tournament in Dallas, as the last Dallas Open was held in 1983.

Past finals

Singles

Doubles

References

External links 
Tournament overview on ATP Tour website
Official website

 
Tennis tournaments in the United States
Indoor tennis tournaments
Hard court tennis tournaments
ATP Tour 250